Ann Agumanu-Chiejine (born 2 February 1974) is a Nigerian football goalkeeper who played for the Nigeria women's national football team at the inaugural 1991 FIFA Women's World Cup and 2000 Summer Olympics. She is an assistant coach for the U17 Nigerian women's team.

Honours
 Nigeria
Player
 African Women's Championship (4): 1998, 2000, 2002, 2004

Assistant Coach
 African Women's Championship winner: 2016

See also
 Nigeria at the 2000 Summer Olympics

References

External links
 
 
 

1974 births
Living people
Nigerian women's footballers
Place of birth missing (living people)
Footballers at the 2000 Summer Olympics
Olympic footballers of Nigeria
Women's association football goalkeepers
1991 FIFA Women's World Cup players
Nigeria women's international footballers
1995 FIFA Women's World Cup players
1999 FIFA Women's World Cup players
 Igbo people